Leeward Islands Football Association (LIFA) is an association of the football playing nations in Leeward archipelago and was founded in 1949. 

It is affiliated to CFU.

Its main tournament is the Leeward Islands Tournament. 

It has 11 members, some of them are not CONCACAF members:
 Antigua and Barbuda
 Saint Kitts^
 Sint Maarten 
 Anguilla
 Saint Croix^
 Montserrat
 Tortola^
 Nevis^
 Saint Martin 
 Saint Thomas^   
 Virgin Gorda^

^ Not affiliated to CONCACAF

External links
RSSSF Page on the Leeward Islands Football Association

Association football governing bodies in the Caribbean
Sports organizations established in 1949